Jaime Bergman Boreanaz (born September 23, 1975) is an American model and actress who was Playboy magazine's Playmate of the Month in January 1999, its 45th Anniversary issue. In addition to her magazine appearance she has appeared in several Playboy videos.

Career
Bergman was the St. Pauli Girl for 1999, the first of the Playmate national spokesmodels for the beer brand.  She has also worked as a Prudential real estate agent.

From 2000 to 2002, Bergman played the character of "B. J. Cummings" in the Howard Stern Baywatch spoof, Son of the Beach. In July 2000, she appeared on the cover of Playboy and in a new nude pictorial inside to promote the show.

Personal life
Jaime Bergman was born in Salt Lake City, Utah. She married actor David Boreanaz on November 24, 2001. They have a son, Jaden Rayne (born May 1, 2002), and a daughter, born in August 2009 whose name was later changed.

In 2010, Boreanaz admitted to having an extramarital affair with Rachel Uchitel, the same woman Tiger Woods was alleged to have an affair with, while he was married. At the time of Boreanaz's affair, Bergman was pregnant with Boreanaz's daughter.

For Valentine's Day 2013, she legally changed her last name to Boreanaz as a gift to her husband and children.

In 2013, Jaime, David, and their friends Melissa and Aaron Ravo started a nail polish line called Chrome Girl. The two wives run the day-to-day operations while their husbands help with the overall business.

Filmography

Film

Television

Appearances in Playboy Special Editions
 Playboy's Playmate Review — August 2000, pp. 4–11.
 Playboy's Playmates in Bed — October 2000, pp. 10–13.
 Playboy's Wet & Wild — January 2001, pp. 2–3 & 44–45.
 Playboy's Sexy Celebrities — February 2001, pp. 48–51.	
 Playboy's Nude Playmates — April 2001, pp. 60–63.
 Playboy's Book of Lingerie — May 2001, pp. 76–79.

References

External links
 

1975 births
American film actresses
American television actresses
Living people
Actresses from Salt Lake City
1990s Playboy Playmates
21st-century American women